Mouthfeel is the fourth studio album by the pop band Magnapop. It was released in 2005 through Daemon Records, with European distribution through DevilDuck Records. The album is the band's first release since their last record in 2004.

Track listing 
All songs written by Linda Hopper and Ruthie Morris, except where noted:
 "We're Faded" – 2:18
 "PDX" – 2:11
 "Pretend I'm There" – 2:35
 "Satellite" (Hopper, Morris, and Scott Rowe) – 3:05
 "California" – 3:56
 "The In-Between" (Hopper, Morris, and Rowe) – 3:18
 "Elliott" – 2:42
 "Smile 4u" – 2:21
 "Think for Yourself" – 3:04
 "Stick to Me" – 2:48
 "Pilgrim's Prayer" – 2:28

German edition bonus live tracks
 "Game of Pricks" (Robert Pollard) – 1:41
 "I Don't Care" – 2:35
 "Lay It Down" – 3:02
 "Open the Door" – 3:13

Personnel 
Magnapop
 Brian Fletcher – drums
 Linda Hopper – lead vocals, art direction, photography
 Ruthie Morris – guitar, backing vocals, art direction, photography
 Scott Rowe – bass guitar

Additional personnel
 Susan Bauer Lee – design
 Cole Gerst – illustrations
 John Keane – mastering
 Nick Kimbrell – illustrations
 Jim Marrer – mixing
 Option-G – illustrations
 Curt Wells – production, engineering

References

External links 

2005 albums
Magnapop albums
Daemon Records albums